Neptune's Bellows is a channel on the southeast side of Deception Island forming the entrance to Port Foster, in the South Shetland Islands. The name, after the Roman sea god Neptune, was appended by American sealers prior to 1822 because of the strong gusts experienced in this narrow channel.

Named for "the gusts that blow in and out as if they came from a trumpet or funnell (sic)."

References

 SCAR Composite Antarctic Gazetteer.

Straits of Antarctica
Geography of Deception Island